Sunray is a city in northeast Moore County, Texas, United States. The population was 1,926 at the 2010 census.

History 

Sunray, Texas, was founded by Jack Clarence Collins.  He was born in Hartley, Texas, in 1893, and in 1902 moved to Channing, Texas, with his parents, Mr. and Mrs. E.S. Collins.  Jack graduated from Channing High School and later, in 1916, from Texas A&M, where he was class valedictorian and class president in his senior year.  Later, he served for several years as cashier of the First National Bank of Channing while extending his family's ranch holdings.  Mr. Collins was well-known and respected in ranching and financial circles, and was a ranking member of the Republican Party for several years.

Jack Collins did not call the town "Sunray" when he laid it out in 1930.  The first lots were sold at $10 each under the name "Altman", but it was discovered that a town in Rusk County had already appropriated that name, hence, the name "Sunray" was used.  A post office was applied for on May 5, 1930, using the name "Altman", but because of the duplication, "Sunray" was not approved until 1935.

Sunray Oil Company bought the holdings of Dana in the early Jones Field in northeast Moore County, which was near the new town. The townsite location was determined by a new Rock Island Railroad route running from Dalhart to Morse along the northern edge of Mr. Collins's townsite survey.

On Sunday, 29 July 1956, the nearby industrial plant was the site of a major accident. The McKee refinery fire killed 19 firefighters when a storage tank suffered a vapor explosion.

Geography

Sunray is located at  (36.019280, –101.823860).

Climate

According to the Köppen climate classification system, Sunray has a semiarid climate, BSk on climate maps.

Demographics

2020 census

As of the 2020 United States census, there were 1,707 people, 781 households, and 577 families residing in the city.

2000 census
As of the census of 2000,  1,950 people, 688 households, and 531 families resided in the city. The population density was 1,154.0 people per square mile (445.5/km). The 772 housing units  averaged 456.9/sq mi (176.4/km). The racial makeup of the city was 72.92% White, 0.72% African American, 0.77% Native American, 0.15% Asian, 23.38% from other races, and 2.05% from two or more races. Hispanics or Latinos of any race were 35.59% of the population.

Of the 688 households, 45.1% had children under the age of 18 living with them, 64.7% were married couples living together, 8.7% had a female householder with no husband present, and 22.8% were not families. About 20.5% of all households were made up of individuals, and 10.0% had someone living alone who was 65 years of age or older. The average household size was 2.83 and the average family size was 3.31.

In the city, the population was distributed as 33.8% under the age of 18, 7.3% from 18 to 24, 29.4% from 25 to 44, 19.7% from 45 to 64, and 9.8% who were 65 years of age or older. The median age was 32 years. For every 100 females, there were 99.4 males. For every 100 females age 18 and over, there were 93.8 males.

The median income for a household in the city was $32,026, and for a family was $36,813. Males had a median income of $31,141 versus $18,077 for females. The per capita income for the city was $16,656. About 11.5% of families and 13.8% of the population were below the poverty line, including 18.1% of those under age 18 and 11.5% of those age 65 or over.

Economy
The Valero McKee Refinery is located several miles southwest of Sunray. It processes 200,000 barrels of oil per day and has 475 full-time personnel.

Education
The City of Sunray is served by the Sunray Independent School District and home to the Sunray High School Bobcats.

References

Cities in Moore County, Texas
Cities in Texas
Sunoco LP
Company towns in Texas
1930 establishments in Texas